Hartola is a small village located in the Nainital district in the state of Uttarakhand in India. Situated near by places like Ramgarh and Nathuakhan, and at a distance of 50 km from Nainital, it known for its orchards. The village has a population of about 680. The village is adjoining Mukteshwar forest reserve, which has the largest population of Banjh (Himalayan oak) along with Burash, devdaar trees and various Himalayan flora and fauna. The geographical altitude of the location is around 8345 ft. It is known for its varieties of fruits like apples, plums, apricots, pears and peaches.

References

External links 
Tourist information about village Hartola

Villages in Nainital district
Tourism in Uttarakhand